The Downtown Eastside Residents Association (DERA) was a non-profit society in the Downtown Eastside area of Vancouver, operating from 1973 until 2010. The association was founded by Bruce Eriksen, Libby Davies, Jean Swanson, University of Victoria professor Calvin Sandborn  and other residents of the Downtown Eastside. Membership was restricted to those who live within the neighbourhood's boundaries. The association's original aims are outlined in its Mission Statement.

The group was actively involved with opposition to the 2010 Winter Olympics, and was accused of possessing the Olympic Flag stolen from Vancouver City Hall on March 16, 2007.  The association has close ties with the Anti-Poverty Committee, with many APC members having worked for the DERA, and live in DERA subsidized housing.

In March 2010, the association was accused of mishandling public money, and failing to pay $500,000 in property taxes and rents from three government-owned social housing buildings that they manage. Since the suit, the three government-owned social housing buildings were handed over to a court-appointed receiver, and an undisclosed settlement was reached between the DERA and BC Housing.

BC Housing issued a proposal call in the summer of 2010 to find nonprofit housing societies to manage the buildings in the long term. Former supporters of the DERA, such as Jim Green, a former Vancouver city councillor who led DERA in the 1980s, stated that this settlement likely means the end of the DERA as a housing provider for the poor. After the settlement, DERA disbanded without an official announcement.

References

External links
http://www.vcn.bc.ca/dera/

Organizations based in Vancouver
Downtown Eastside